Aulad is a 1987 Indian Hindi-language drama film, produced by Chander Sadanah under the Sadanah Brothers banner and directed by Vijay Sadanah. Starring Jeetendra, Sridevi , Jaya Prada   and music composed by Laxmikant–Pyarelal. The film is inspired by the Telugu film Maa Babu (1960), which itself was a remake of the Hindi film Chirag Kahan Roshni Kahan. The film was the 6th highest grosser of the year and was declared a Super Hit at the box office.

Plot
Anand (Jeetendra) is a businessman. He comes across several times with a street dancer Devki (Sridevi). One day Anand's uncle (Saeed Jaffrey) informs him from abroad that he has decided to get him married in near future. Upon hearing this, Anand tells a lie to his uncle that he has already got married. Anand's uncle suddenly comes to India and asks for Anand's wife. Anand makes Devki his wife for a while to save himself from his uncle. Devki serves Anand's uncle as his father to the extent that he appreciates Devki and likes her from every aspect. Anand's uncle goes back abroad. Meanwhile, Anand falls in love with Devki and marries with her. Both happen to meet with another newly married couple Yashoda (Jaya Prada) and Vicky (Vinod Mehra). While Devki gives birth to a son names Kishan, Yashoda is expecting. The two couples meet on a train, which is ill-fated as it meets with an accident. Devki is nowhere to be found, and Anand believes she is dead. Vicky dies in the accident and Yashoda is devastated. Anand feels sorry for Yashoda and has the doctor switch his baby for the dead one. Yashoda returns to her home and her in-laws with Anand's child, while he re-locates abroad. Four years later, Anand returns and is unable to keep away from Yashoda and the child. He repeatedly keeps on visiting them, to the extent that his visits get to be a nuisance and an embarrassment. Then Anand is overjoyed to know that Devki is still alive. But when Devki asks about their child, he tells her the truth, thus setting off a tussle between the two mothers. Devki is further devastated by knowing that she can never give birth to a child again. Anand's uncle returns from abroad and sees devastated situation of Devki who was missing her son badly. Uncle can't bear the situation from which Devki is suffering from. He prepares to sue the matter publicly in court. Court passes order to hand the child over to Devki. However, the child cannot forget Yashoda. The situation begins from bad to worse and worst for Anand and Devki. Both decide to give the child back to Yashoda where he gets real happiness. When they hand the child over to Yashoda, Devki fells down due to headache. Doctor gives good news that miraculously she is expecting and would become mother in near future.

Cast

 Jeetendra as Anand
 Sridevi as Devki
 Jaya Prada as Yashoda
 Vinod Mehra as Vicky
 Saeed Jaffrey as Anand's  Uncle
 Baby Guddu as Kishan
 Asrani as Raja
 Bharat Bhushan
 Manmohan Krishna as Vicky's Father
 Murad 
 Ramesh Deo
 Vikas Anand
 Shivraj 
 Dina Pathak as Savitri
 Shammi
 Mumtaz Begum

Soundtrack

References

External links

1980s Hindi-language films
1987 films
Films scored by Laxmikant–Pyarelal
Indian pregnancy films
Indian courtroom films
Hindi remakes of Telugu films